Sarawak Chamber is the largest known cave chamber in the world by area and the second largest by volume after the Miao Room in China. It is in Gua Nasib Bagus (Good Luck Cave), which is located in Gunung Mulu National Park, in the Malaysian Territory of Sarawak on the island of Borneo.

Discovery 
The chamber was discovered by three British cavers, Andy Eavis, Dave Checkley and Tony White, in January 1981 during the Mulu'80 Expedition. The story of how it was discovered is told in the books Underground Worlds  and Giant Caves of Borneo.

Its volume and area were checked by laser scanning in 2011 and were found to be  and  respectively.

To reach Sarawak Chamber, one must follow a river upstream from the cave entrance. Accompanied visits can be arranged by the national Park.

Geology and formation 
Sarawak Chamber is formed in Melinau Limestone, a reef complex of Upper Eocene to Early Miocene age. It was formed by karstic solutional processes in addition to the erosion of its sandstone basement. Its exceptional area is thought to be the result of the stability provided by the structure of the rocks in which it lies, dipping strata forming an anticline flank close to a syncline axis.

Fiction 
The feeling of agoraphobia experienced by one of the discoverers is referenced in the novel House of Leaves by Mark Z. Danielewski.

References 

 Kirby, Matt (2011), Mulu Caves 2011, Mulu Caves Project.

 Jackson [ed], Underground Worlds (1985) Time Life Books. Earth Series.
 Meredith, Wooldridge and Lyon, Giant Caves of Borneo (1992) Tropical Press.
 Facts and Fallacies - Stories of the Strange and Unusual (1989). Reader's Digest Ltd. pp. 14–15. .
 Extreme Earth Collins (2003) Pp. 78–79. 
  House of Leaves (2000) p. 125.

External links 
 Description of the Sarawak Chamber at the Mulu Caves project.  
Surveying Sarawak Chamber at Sarawak Caves
 Short description at www.showcaves.com.
 World's Largest Cave - Sarawak Chamber
China's “Supercave” Takes Title as World's Most Enormous Cavern 

Limestone caves
Wild caves
Caves of Sarawak